Chanri, aka Fateh Chanri, is a village and deh in Talher taluka of Badin District, Sindh. As of 2017, it has a population of 3,121, in 657 households. It is the seat of a tapedar circle, which also includes the villages of Mughal Hafiz, Wasi Sajan, Weesarki, and Widh.

References 

Populated places in Badin District